Gajner is a town located 37 kilometres from the city of Kanpur in the Kanpur Dehat district of the state of Uttar Pradesh, India. Gajner is located 11 kilometres from the district headquarters of Kanpur Dehat. Gajner is a connecting link of Kanpur, Ghatampur, Musanagar and Pukhrayan.

Geography
Gajner is located in the doab of the rivers Ganga and Yamuna of Uttar Pradesh. Some parts here are rugged and are not suited to cultivation and agriculture. Gajner is located 129 m above sea level. The Yamuna river is located 17 kilometres south of the city.

Districts located nearby include Akbarpur, Kanpur and Pukhrayan.

Population
According to Census Data Gajner has a total population of 6,337 people living in 1,128 houses, with males comprising 52%, and females 48%. The total literacy rate is 60.7%.

Agriculture
Gajner covers an area of 544.98 hectares, including a non-agricultural area of 69.63 hectares and a total irrigation area of 320.15 hectares. Paddy, maize, jowar, wheat, gram, moong, urd, and other green vegetables are agriculture commodities are grown.

Climate
The climate is very tropical with little rainfall. Temperatures range from 8 °C in winter to 40 °C in summer. The monsoon season lasts from mid-June to September. Winters can get very misty.

Culture

Traditional clothing
Women traditionally wear shalwar kameez, gagra cholis and saris. Dupattas are worn to complete the outfit. Men traditionally wear kurtas. Western influences can also be seen in urban centres and rural areas.

Cuisine
Wheat forms the staple diet of North India and is usually served in the form of roti or chapatis along with subzi (vegetarian curry dishes).

Languages 
The native languages of Gajner are Hindi and Urdu, with most people being bilingual.

Festivals
People celebrate Holi at the end of winter, on the last full moon of the lunar month Phalgun (Phalgun Purnima in February or March).
The second festival of Gajner is Dussehra, where the town holds a fair.
The third and biggest festival celebrating in Gajner is Diwali. Diwali is a five-day festival which formally begins two days before the night of Diwali, and ends two days thereafter.

Communities
All the villages near Gajner are predominantly Hindu, with Gajner itself being predominantly Rajputs and including various ethnic groups such as the Kurmi, Sachan, Brahmins, Ahirs, Banias, Dalits and Muslims.

Communication
There is a sub-post office at Gajner.

Transport and Connectivity

Roadways

Government public bus and private bus services operate in Gajner. The UPSRTC serve the roadway's buses from Kanpur Central to Gajner. The travelling time by bus is 1 hour 15 minutes. The town is well connected by four-way roads. Four road tracks run through Gajner.

The first route connecting National Highway 19 at Raipur with Musanagar passes through the centre of the town, covering a distance of 35 kilometres. The second route connecting Nabipur to Ghatampur also passes through the centre of the town, covering a distance of 38 kilometres.

Rail
Rasulpur Gogumau is the nearest railway station, connecting Jhansi with Kanpur Central. To the west is Paman Railway Station at Paman.
Tilaunchi Railway Station is on the railway line connecting Jhansi Junction railway station with Kanpur Central.
Gajner can also be reached from Kanpur Central railway station, with a distance of 44 kilometres.

Air

Kanpur Airport is a domestic airport that was originally designated for the Indian Air Force in Chakeri, India. A new terminal building is under construction at Mawaiya village with a capacity of 300 passengers per hour and six airplanes at a time.

Metro
 
Kanpur Metro is the nearest rail system, currently under construction, which will be extended to the Kanpur metropolitan area. In Phase 1, 22 metro stations will be built on the Red Line from IIT Kanpur to Naubasta and 8 metro stations will be built on the Blue Line from the Agriculture University to Barra-8.

Health services
Gajner contains a number of health services, including a Government Hospital, Community Health Center Gajner, Gajner NPHC Primary Health Center and Veterinary Dispensary Gajner. Private medical services are also available in rural areas around Gajner.

Education and research
Gajner contains a number of schools, including higher education and medical education

Higher Education
Indian Institute of Technology Kanpur (also known as IIT Kanpur or IITK) is a public technical and research university located in Kanpur.
Harcourt Butler Technical University is a state technical university in Kanpur. HBTU offers its students a wide variety of undergraduate and postgraduate courses.
Pranveer Singh Institute of Technology is an engineering institute also located nearby.

Medical Education

Ganesh Shankar Vidyarthi Memorial Medical College (GSVMMC or GSVM Medical College) is a state-run medical college in Kanpur. Lala Lajpat Rai Hospital (LLR Hospital), which is also known as Hallet Hospital, is associated with GSVM, Kanpur.

References

Gajner, at www.india9.com
District Kanpur Dehat - Telephone & E Mail Directory
 District Court Kanpur Dehat
"Kanpur Dehat". Retrieved 30 July 2018.

External links
 kanpurdehat.nic.in

Cities and towns in Kanpur Dehat district